Sky Hunter  is a Chinese war film directed by Li Chen. It is Li's directorial debut. The film is produced in collaboration with the People's Liberation Army Air Force and is China's first aerial warfare film. It was released on September 29, 2017.

Synopsis
The plot centers on an elite group of Chinese soldiers whose mission is to thwart a terrorist plot and to resolve a hostage crisis.

Cast
Li Chen
Fan Bingbing
Wang Qianyuan
Li Jiahang
Leon Lee
Guo Mingyu 
Ye Liu
Wu Xiubo
Wang Xueqi
AJ Donnelly

Production
The film had the full support of the People's Liberation Army Air Force (PLAAF), with it being the first time that a film crew was allowed access to the military bases by the People's Liberation Army Air Force for shooting. Military experts and trainers serve as advisers for the movie's script, which is primarily written by air force Lieutenant Colonel Zhang Li.

Filming 
The film features various front line combat aircraft, including the Y-20 airlifter, the J-20 stealth fighter, the J-11, the H-6, and the J-10 multirole combat aircraft. Scenes were shot in various parts of China and Kazakhstan.

Casting
Director Li’s then-girlfriend and top Chinese actress Fan Bingbing was cast as the female lead, playing a PLA pilot. Fan reportedly received no wage for her appearance.

Music 
The score was composed by Andrew Kawczynski and recorded at Synchron Stage Vienna in Austria. Hans Zimmer served as the executive music producer. Chinese singer and actor Lu Han lent his vocals for the film's ending theme song "Chasing Dream With Childlike Heart".

Awards and nominations

References

2017 films
2017 action films
Chinese aviation films
Chinese war films
Chinese action thriller films
Films about terrorism in Asia
2010s Mandarin-language films